Machites Doxas Pefkon B.C., or simply Machites B.C. (alternate spellings: Mahites, Doxa) (Greek: Μαχητές Δόξας Πεύκων K.A.E.), is a Greek professional basketball team that is located in Pefka, Thessaloniki, Greece. The athletic club's full name is Athlitikos Syllogos Machites Doxas Pefkon (Greek: Αθλητικός Σύλλογος Μαχητές Δόξας Πεύκων), abbreviated as A.S. Machites Doxas Pefkon. The club's name can be translated in English to "Glory Fighters Pines".

History
Doxa Retzikiou (Greek: Δόξα Ρετζικίου) played in the 4th-tier level Greek C Basket League during the 2011–12 season. Then, in 2012, Doxa Retzikiou and Machites Pefkon (Μαχητές Πεύκων) merged, to form the club of Machites Doxas Pefkon, in its current form. The club then played in the 3rd-tier level Greek B Basket League during the 2012–13, 2013–14, and 2014–15 seasons.

The club then moved up to the 2nd-tier level Greek A2 Basket League, where it played in the 2015–16 and the 2016–17 seasons.

Roster

Notable players

 Petros Geromichalos
 Dimitris Gravas
 Nikos Diplaros
 Sakis Tataris
 Sigurður Þorsteinsson
 Karamo Jawara

References

External links 
Official website 
Eurobasket.com Team Page

Basketball teams in Greece